The remains of at least 230 Roman amphitheatres have been found widely scattered around the area of the Roman Empire. These are large, circular or oval open-air venues with raised 360 degree seating and not to be confused with the more common theatres, which are semicircular structures. There are, however, a number of buildings that have had a combined use as both theatre and amphitheatre, particularly in western Europe. Following is an incomplete list of Roman amphitheatre locations by country.

See also
 Roman architecture
 Circus (building)
 Arena
 Stadium
Related modern building structures
 List of contemporary amphitheatres
 List of association football stadiums by capacity
 List of indoor arenas
 List of stadiums

References

External links

 Aerial Photographs
 article "Amphitheatrum" (Smith's Dictionary of Greek and Roman Antiquities)
 Rome: Colosseum at LacusCurtius with Platner article
 Small list with details
 Several photographs
 Google Earth file containing several locations
 Romanheritage.com site with photos of Roman Amphitheaters

List
Roman amphitheatres
Amphitheatres, Roman
Amphitheatres